The 1973 Football Championship of Ukrainian SSR was the 43rd season of association football competition of the Ukrainian SSR, which was part of the Soviet Second League in Zone 1. The season started on 31 March 1973.

The 1974 Football Championship of Ukrainian SSR was won by SC Tavriya Simferopol.

At the end of the season all six teams from Eastern Ukraine withdrew from competitions.

Teams

Location map

Relegated teams 
 FC Kryvbas Kryvyi Rih – (returning after two seasons)

Promoted teams 
 none

Final standings

Top goalscorers 
The following were the top goalscorers.

See also 
 Soviet Second League

External links 
 1973 Soviet Second League, Zone 1 (Ukrainian SSR football championship). Luhansk football portal
 1973 Soviet championships (all leagues) at helmsoccer.narod.ru

1973
3
Soviet
Soviet
football
Football Championship of the Ukrainian SSR